Clubul Sportiv Viitorul Minerul Lupeni, commonly known as Minerul Lupeni, is a Romanian football club based in Lupeni, Hunedoara County which competes in Liga IV – Hunedoara County, the fourth tier of the Romanian football league system. Established in 1920 as Jiul Lupeni, the club changed its name several times to Partizanul (1950), Flacăra (1951), Minerul (1953 and 1957) and Energia (1956). Dissolved in 2010, the club from Jiu Valley was re-founded as Viitorul Minerul Lupeni in 2021.

History

The team of miners from the Lupeni coal basin was founded in 1920 as Jiul Lupeni. In 1926, the club merger for a short time with CAMP playing under the name of Jiul Lupeni.

In the 1927–28 season, the Jiu Valley team managed to won the Arad Regional Championship qualified for the national tournament of the Divizia A and managing to reach the final of the competition,  where lost in front of Colțea Brașov with 2–3. The lineup from the final with Adalbert Szabo as coach: Ioan Kiss – Eugen Szabados, Rupp – Alexandru Berkessy, Szüle, Gentl – Kertesz, Aurel Guga, Bognar, Joseph Kilianovitz, Meszner.

Renamed as Minerul, the club played for the first time in Cupa României in the 1935–36 season, but was eliminated in the quarter-finals by the strong team of Ripensia Timişoara 2–9, the team that won the trophy in that season. Also, The Miners played in the first season of the Third Division finishing as runners-up in the Western League and promoted to Second Division at the end of the 1937–38 season of Divizia C.

The Red-Blacks played the next three seasons in the Second Division Championship finished fourth in 1938–39, second  in 1939–40 and sixth in 1940–41.

After the Second World War, Minerul continued to evolve in Divizia B, finishing the 1946–47 season on 12th place in the second series.

The Miners played the next decade in the Second Division often finishing at mid-table or fighting to save from relegation: 6th (1947–48), 5th (1948–49), 4th (1950), 11th (1951) spared from relegation due to the move of Flacăra București at Ploiești and disappearance of former Flacăra Ploiești (Prahova Ploiești), 10th (1952), 14th (1953), 6th (1954), 9th (1955), 9th (1956), 6th (1957–58). 

At the end of the 1958–59 season, Minerul finished 1st in the Serie I of the Second Division and promoted in Divizia A after fifteen seasons in Divizia B. The squad managed by Vasile Lazăr  as head coach and Adalbert Pall as assistant coach was composed of: Ioan Kiss II, Simion Plev, Alexandru Coman, Vasile Keresteș, Ștefan Szöke, Ioan Groza, Carol Mihaly, Constantin Cotroază, I.Pall, Mircea Onea, Tudor Paraschiva, Carol Creiniceanu among others.

With some new players such as Teodor Mihalache, Daniel Peretz, Ion Leahovici, Alexandru Dan II, Milea, Alexandru Nisipeanu, Virgil Mihăilă, Mihai Țurcan, D.Cucu, N.Stanciu among others, Minerul played four years in the First Division finishing three seasons in a row on 11th place, before being relegated at the end of the 1962–63 season when finished on the last place. The Red-Blacks reached the quarter-finals of the 1959–60 Cupa României, losing 3–1 to Dinamo Obor București.

Minerul withdrew from the championship during the 2010–11 Liga II season and dissolved after ninety years of existence. 

In the fall of 2021, the former captain of Minerul, Adrian Lumperdean, together with his brother, Emil Lumperdean and their nephew, Lucu Lumperdean, decided to bring back to life the football tradition from Lupeni, laying the foundations of Viitorul Minerul Lupeni.

In the beginning, the three members of the Lumperdean family, along with the local authorities of Lupeni, revived the groups for children and youths and later enrolled the seniors team in the 2022–23 season of Liga IV – Hunedoara County.

Honours
Liga I
Runners-up (1): 1927–28
Liga II
Winners (1): 1958–59
Runners-up (1): 1939–40
Liga III
Winners (5): 1937–38, 1975–76, 1979–80, 1982–83, 2004–05
Runners-up (5): 1936–37, 1968–69, 1973–74, 1978–79, 1991–92

Notable players 
The footballers mentioned below have played at least 1 season for Minerul Lupeni and also played in Liga I for another team.

  Ștefan Onisie
  Cristian Bălgrădean
  Mircea Popa
  Lucian Burchel
  Cornel Irina
  Horațiu Lasconi
  Tudor Paraschiva
  Carol Creiniceanu
  Aurel Guga
  Ioan Kiss
  Andrei Stocker
  Aurel Moise
  Sándor Schwartz
  Tiberiu Csik
  Ovidiu Vezan

Former managers

  Vasile Lazăr
  Petre Libardi
  Gogu Tonca
  Adrian Matei 
  Gabriel Stan 
  Dan Mănăilă 
  Marin Tudorache 
  Petre Gigiu 
  Ionel Augustin

References

External links
 Unofficial Website

Football clubs in Romania
Football clubs in Hunedoara County
Association football clubs established in 1920
Hunedoara County
Liga I clubs
Liga II clubs
Liga III clubs
Liga IV clubs
Mining association football teams in Romania
1920 establishments in Romania